South Wales Hornets was a rugby league amateur feeder club for South Wales Scorpions. They played at Glan-Yr-Afron Park, the home of Blackwood RFC.

The Hornets competed in Conference Three of the new RFL structure – the renamed Conference National League replacing fellow Welsh side Valley Cougars who have returned to the Welsh Conference.

The aim is that with a brand new, flagship, club in the Conference National the player pathway system in South Wales can continue to prosper as players from all over South Wales have the opportunity to turn out for the Hornets.

The Hornets won their first game - a 36-28 Conference Three win over St Albans Centurions.

After one year of existence the South Wales Hornets were disbanded.

See also

List of rugby league clubs in Britain

References

External links

2012 establishments in Wales
Rugby clubs established in 2012
Welsh rugby league teams